Clinton scandal may refer to:

 Clinton–Lewinsky scandal (1998), involving U.S. President Bill Clinton and his sex scandal with intern Monica Lewinsky
 Hillary Clinton email controversy (2015–2016), in which U.S. presidential candidate Hillary Clinton was found to have used unsecured, unofficial computer channels to transmit classified email